is a former Japanese football player.

Playing career
Tomishima was born in Kumamoto Prefecture on June 1, 1964. After graduating from Fukuoka University, he joined Japan Soccer League Division 2 club All Nippon Airways (later Yokohama Flügels) in 1987. He played many matches as forward and the club was promoted to Division 1 in 1988. In 1992, Japan Soccer League was folded and founded new league J1 League. However his opportunity to play decreased in 1993 and he moved to Japan Football League club Fujieda Blux (later Fukuoka Blux). However he could not play at all in the match and retired end of 1995 season.

Club statistics

References

External links

1964 births
Living people
Fukuoka University alumni
Association football people from Kumamoto Prefecture
Japanese footballers
Japan Soccer League players
J1 League players
Japan Football League (1992–1998) players
Yokohama Flügels players
Avispa Fukuoka players
Association football forwards